This article details the fixtures and results of the Thailand national football team.

Results

1940s

1950s

1960s

1970s

1980s

1990s

2000s

2010s

2020s

See also
 Thailand national football team head-to-head record
 Thailand women's national football team results

References 
 https://www.worldfootball.net/teams/thailand-team/21/